Preserje pri Komnu is a small settlement immediately west of Komen in the Littoral region of Slovenia.

Name
The name of the settlement was changed from Preserje to Preserje pri Komnu in 1955.

References

External links

Preserje pri Komnu on Geopedia

Populated places in the Municipality of Komen